Shady Radwan (born 1 September 2001) is an Egyptian footballer who currently plays as a forward for Al Ahly. He was included in The Guardian's "Next Generation 2018".

Career statistics

Club

Notes

References

2001 births
Living people
Egyptian footballers
Egypt youth international footballers
Association football forwards
Al Ahly SC players
Egyptian Premier League players